The Willgerodt rearrangement or Willgerodt reaction is an organic reaction converting an aryl alkyl ketone, alkyne, or alkene to the corresponding amide by reaction with ammonium polysulfide, named after Conrad Willgerodt. The formation of the corresponding carboxylic acid is a side reaction. When the alkyl group is an aliphatic chain (n typically 0 to 5), multiple reactions take place with the amide group always ending up at the terminal end.  

An example with modified reagents (sulfur, concentrated ammonium hydroxide and pyridine) is the conversion of acetophenone to 2-phenylacetamide and phenylacetic acid

Willgerodt–Kindler reaction

The related Willgerodt–Kindler reaction takes place with elemental sulfur and an amine like morpholine. The initial product is a thioacetamide for example that of acetophenone which can again be hydrolyzed to the amide. The reaction is named after Karl Kindler.

Reaction mechanism
A possible reaction mechanism for the Kindler variation is depicted below:

The first stage of the reaction is basic imine formation by the ketone group and the amine group of morpholine to the enamine which reacts in a conjugate addition (see Stork enamine alkylation for a related step) with sulfur to the sulfide. The actual rearrangement reaction takes place when the amine group attacks the thiocarbonyl in a nucleophilic addition temporarily forming an aziridine and the thioacetamide by tautomerization.

References

Rearrangement reactions
Name reactions